is a passenger railway station in the town of Okutama, Tokyo, Japan, operated by the East Japan Railway Company (JR East).

Lines
Kori Station is served by the Ōme Line, located 31.6 kilometers from the terminus of the line at Tachikawa Station.

Station layout
The station consists of two side platforms serving two tracks. The station can accommodate trains up to 6-car lengths. The station is unattended.

Platforms

History
The station opened on 1 July 1944. With the privatization of Japanese National Railways (JNR) on 1 April 1987, the station came under the control of JR East.

Passenger statistics
In fiscal 2014, the station was used by an average of 683 passengers daily (boarding passengers only).

The passenger figures for previous years are as shown below.

See also
 List of railway stations in Japan

References

External links

 JR East station information 

Stations of East Japan Railway Company
Railway stations in Tokyo
Ōme Line
Railway stations in Japan opened in 1944
Okutama, Tokyo